Purolator 500 may refer to two different NASCAR races:

 Purolator 500 (Pocono), the race at Pocono Raceway from 1974 to 1976 (now Gander Outdoors 400)
 Purolator 500 (Atlanta), the race at Atlanta Motor Speedway from 1994 to 1996 (now Kobalt Tools 500)